Blair Peak is a sharp peak,  high, situated  southeast of Rumdoodle Peak in the Masson Range of the Framnes Mountains. It was mapped by Norwegian cartographers from aerial photographs taken by the Lars Christensen Expedition, 1936–37, re-mapped by Australian National Antarctic Research Expeditions, 1957–60, and named for James Blair, a senior diesel mechanic at Mawson Station, 1958.

References 

Mountains of Mac. Robertson Land